Fred or Frederick Turner is the name of:

Sportsmen
Fred Turner (footballer) (1930–1955), English footballer
Freddy Turner (1914–2003), South African rugby player
Frederick Harding Turner (1888–1915), Scottish rugby player

Writers and academics
Frederick Jackson Turner (1861–1932), American historian
Frederick Turner (Jesuit) (1910–2001), British priest, archivist and librarian
Frederick Turner (poet) (born 1943), American poet
Frederick W. Turner (born 1937), American author, editor of Geronimo's autobiography, Redemption, The Go-Between 
Fred Turner (author), professor of communication at Stanford University and author
Fred Turner (botanist) (1852–1939), Australian botanist

Others
Fred L. Turner (1933–2013), American restaurant executive, CEO and chairman of McDonald's until 2004
Fred Turner (musician) (born 1943), Canadian founding member of Bachman–Turner Overdrive
W. Fred Turner (1922–2003), American attorney
F. A. Turner (1858–1923), American actor, sometimes credited as Fred Turner
Frederick C. Turner, Jr., American soldier and educator, first Black student and faculty member at Arkansas State University
Frederick C. Turner (1923–2014), vice admiral in the United States Navy
Frederick Turner (unionist) (born 1846), English-born American labor union leader
Fred Turner (entrepreneur), British business executive in the United States, founder of Curative, Inc.
Frederick Storrs Turner, British clergyman and campaigner against the opium trade

See also 
Turner (surname)